The 2020 season of the astronomy TV show Star Gazers starring Trace Dominguez started on January 6, 2020.  Episodes of the television series are released on the show's website at the start of the month, up to a month prior to any episode's broadcast date.

During this season, extra episodes (described as clips on part of the show's official website) were produced in addition to the regular weekly televised episodes.  These episodes tended to be longer than the weekly televised episodes; although, the durations of these episodes tended to vary from clip to clip. While the regular weekly episodes were designed to be presented during a specific week, the content of the extra episodes tended to focus on more general astronomical topics rather than on specific astronomical events which were occurring within a more limited time span, meaning that the extra episodes could be aired at any time during a longer time span.  Two of these extra episodes were produced and released in pairs every month, using the same format which had been used for the discontinued five-minute format of the weekly television episodes.

2020 season

Evergreen Segments

References

External links 
  Star Gazer official website
 

Lists of Jack Horkheimer: Star Gazer episodes
2020 American television seasons